Chlorophorus varius, the grape wood borer, is a species of beetle in the family Cerambycidae.

Taxonomy
It was described by O.F. Müller in 1766 under the original name of Leptura varia.

Subspecies and varietas
Subspecies and varietas include:
 Chlorophorus varius damascenus Chevrolat, 1854 
 Chlorophorus varius varius (O.F. Müller, 1766)
 Chlorophorus varius varius var. incarnus Plavilstshikov

Distribution
This species is present in most of Europe (except the north) (Albania, Austria, Belarus, Bulgaria, Corsica, Croatia, Cyprus, Czech Republic, France, Germany, Greece, Hungary, Italy, Latvia, Malta, Montenegro, North Macedonia, Poland, Romania, Serbia, Slovakia, Slovenia, Spain, Sweden, Switzerland, Ukraine), Caucasus, Transcaucasia, Turkey, North Iran and in the Near East (Egypt, Israel, Jordan, Lebanon, Syria).

Habitat

Description
The body of these beetles is elongated and rather variable in coloration and markings (hence the Latin species name varius). It is covered by a yellow-greenish pubescence, more rarely gray or whitish. The male has longer antennae (reaching mid-elytra) than the female. The pronotum is barred by a black band, sometimes limited to three black spots. The pronotum and elytra have the same width. Elytra are matt, with a C-shaped black marking and two other transversal  wasp-like black bands. Legs and antennae are dark brown. Larvae reach a length of about 15 mm.

Biology
Adults can be found from May to September.  They feed on pollen and nectar of various flowers, especially of Apiaceae. The life cycle lasts 2 – 3 years. Larvae are saproxylic, mainly developing in the wood and dead branches of deciduous trees and shrubs (Vitis, Acer, Quercus, Populus, Malus, Crataegus, Juglans, etc.), sometimes of conifers. Pupation occurs in spring in the wood.

Gallery

References

External links
 Beetles and coleopterologists
 Insektenbox

Clytini
Beetles described in 1766
Taxa named by Otto Friedrich Müller